This list is of the Marine Protected Areas (Italian: aree marine protette) of Italy. As of the most recent Official list of natural protected areas [it], decreed on 27 April 2010 and published in the official gazzette on 31 May 2010 by the Ministry for Environment, Land and Sea Protection, there were twenty-seven such marine protected areas, and a further two "Submerged Archaeological Parks" (Italian: parchi sommersi); in 2018, two new marine protected areas were created. The Ligurian Sea Cetacean Sanctuary is not included in these figures. While some stakeholders have opposed such measures, fearing the impact on short-term economic exploitation, a study of the alternatives at Portofino suggested that steps at protection might offer not only environmental benefits but also the concomitant potential of enhanced long-term usufruct.

List of Marine Protected Areas

List of Submerged Archaeological Parks

See also

 Conservation in Italy
 List of National Parks of Italy
 List of Regional Parks of Italy

References

External links
  Marine Protected Areas
  Official list of protected areas

Marine protected areas
Italy